David Madden (born 6 January 1963) is an English retired professional footballer who played in the 1990 FA Cup Final with Crystal Palace.

Career
Beginning as an apprentice at Southampton, Madden had a loan spell at AFC Bournemouth before joining Arsenal in summer of 1983. He mainly played for Arsenal's reserve side but also made two First Division appearances; he made his debut against West Bromwich Albion on 3 December 1983, and his second match was a week later at his boyhood heroes West Ham United. He was granted a free transfer at the end of the 1983–84 season.

He moved to Charlton Athletic and had later spells with the Los Angeles Lazers, Reading, Crystal Palace, Birmingham City and Maidstone United. After retiring as a player in 1991, Madden became assistant manager of Maidstone United. Whilst at Palace, although he missed a substantial part of the season through injury, Madden made 19 appearances, scoring five times, in 1988–89 when the club achieved promotion via the play-offs. In the play-off final second leg, against Blackburn Rovers, Madden scored a penalty to make the score 2–0 to Palace (3–3 on aggregate) and take the game to extra time when a goal from Ian Wright secured promotion. Madden also appeared in both the 1990 FA Cup Final and replay against Manchester United as a substitute.

References

External links

1963 births
Living people
Footballers from Stepney
Association football midfielders
English footballers
Southampton F.C. players
AFC Bournemouth players
Arsenal F.C. players
Charlton Athletic F.C. players
Los Angeles Lazers players
Reading F.C. players
Crystal Palace F.C. players
Birmingham City F.C. players
Maidstone United F.C. (1897) players
English Football League players
FA Cup Final players